Flight of the Doves is a 1971 British Eastmancolor children's film based on the novel by Irish writer Walter Macken. The film, based and filmed in Ireland, was written by Frank Gabrielson and Ralph Nelson, with Nelson also directing.

Plot
Two Liverpool children set out in search of love after many years of receiving abuse from their "Uncle" Toby Cromwell. Cromwell is stepfather to the Dove children; their mother having married Cromwell after the death of her first husband, the children's father. Cromwell was granted custody after her death.

Finn Dove and his sister Derval are tired of their stepfather's constant abuse and neglect, and they run away to Ireland to find their grandmother in County Galway. The children are unaware that they are heirs to their grandfather's estate and stand to inherit a large fortune, around $10,000 each, upon his death. However, if the children are either dead or missing, the money would go to their uncle "Hawk" Dove, an unsuccessful actor known for his temper, and he will do about anything to get what he wants. When Hawk discovers their fortune, he wants to make sure the Dove children never are seen again.

They arrive in Dublin on St Patrick's Day. The Dove children's journey across Ireland isn't easy, and they are discovered missing. Their stepfather had been informed of the inheritance (by Hawk Dove disguised as a lawyer). Toby decides to bring in the police, and Uncle Hawk and Uncle Toby are close on their trail. The chase takes them to a St Patrick's Day parade, a synagogue, Dublin's Ha'penny Bridge, a travellers' encampment, and other places.

Cast
 Ron Moody as John Cyril Dove - "Hawk" / Maxwell Perdon / DCI Wolcott / Miss Heather Marblestone / Dermot Corcoran
 Jack Wild as Finn Dove
 Dorothy McGuire as Mary Magdalene St. Bridget O'Flaherty - "Granny"
 Stanley Holloway as Judge Fenton Liffy
 Helen Raye as Derval Dove
 Willie Rushton as Tobias Cromwell - "Uncle Toby"
 Brendan O'Reilly as Insp. Michael Roark
 Dana as Sheila O'Ryan
 John Molloy as Mickser
 Noel Purcell as Rabbi
 Tom Hickey as Garda Pat Flynn
 Niall Tóibín as Sergeant O'Casey
 Barry Keegan as Powder O'Ryan
 Emmet Bergin as Paddy
 Robert Rietti as Irish airport TV reporter (voice)

Production

Music
The film was scored by Roy Budd, who had made his film soundtrack debut in Ralph Nelson's previous film Soldier Blue. His score contains two songs: "You Don't Have to Be Irish to Be Irish", which is sung as the St Patrick's Day Parade song, and "The Far Off Place". The latter is sung by Dana, who plays the role of Sheila, an Irish Traveller, and the song is half in Irish and half in English. Both songs are about having dreams, reaching goals, and seeing "the far off place".

References

External links
 
 
 
 

1971 films
1971 drama films
Films directed by Ralph Nelson
Films scored by Roy Budd
Columbia Pictures films
British drama films
Saint Patrick's Day films
Films based on Irish novels
1970s English-language films
1970s British films